Ward Thomas can refer to:

 Ward Thomas (band), a British country music duo
 Ward Thomas (television executive), a British television executive
 Ward Thomas Removals, a British removal firm